Ahmad Shahrul Azhar Sofian (born 24 October 1974) is a Malaysian former footballer best known for his time with Perak, where he was team captain and wore the number 7 jersey. He was a central midfielder.

Career
Shahrul spent almost his entire career with Perak FA. He made his debut in 1996 and remained with Perak FA until 2008 except in 1998 and 1999, where he joined Negeri Sembilan FA. He is a highly-influential player for Perak FA, but is perhaps more known for his fiery temperament than his footballing abilities. He was once banned 12 months for his antics against the fourth official after receiving a red card against Selangor MPPJ.

Shahrul made his international senior debut at the 1999 Dunhill Cup in Vietnam. He also played in the 1999 Southeast Asian Games where he scored a hat-trick against Cambodia. In 2000, Ahmad Shahrul was selected as the captain of the national team. On 25 May 2002, he was called up for an international friendly match against five times World Cup winners Brazil. He was selected as one of the first eleven to play against Brazilian stars such as Ronaldo and Barca's Ronaldinho. His last appearance with the national team is at the 2002 Asian Games in Busan, South Korea.

He was also sent off in the 2007 Malaysia Cup final for a second-bookable offence. Perak went on to lose that match 3-0.

He played for Proton FC in the 2009 Malaysia Premier League, and retired at the end of the season.

Previously Shahrul works as Assistant Coach of U20 Negeri Sembilan FA.

Currently he works as Manager of Perak FA.

International goals

Goals for Senior National Team

Personal life
His grandfather, Ahmad Nazari was also a football player and a part of the Malaya national football team when it finished third in the 1962 Asian Games in Jakarta.

Honours
Perak
 Malaysia Premier League 1: 2002, 2003
 Malaysia Cup: 2000
 Malaysia FA Cup: 2004
 Sultan Haji Ahmad Shah Cup: 2005, 2006

Awards
Shahrul was honoured by the Perak state in 2005 along with his teammates Chan Wing Hoong, K. Nanthakumar, Mohd Hamsani Ahmad and Syamsul Saad for their contributions to state football.

References

External links
 
 Biodata Ahmad Shahrul Azhar

1974 births
Living people
Malaysian people of Malay descent
Malaysian footballers
Malaysia international footballers
People from Perak
Perak F.C. players
People from Ipoh
Footballers at the 2002 Asian Games
Association football midfielders
Asian Games competitors for Malaysia